is a passenger railway station in located in the city of Higashiōsaka,  Osaka Prefecture, Japan, operated by the private railway operator Kintetsu Railway.

Lines
Ishikiri Station is served by the Nara Line, and is located 10.1 rail kilometers from the starting point of the line at Fuse Station and 16.2 kilometers from Ōsaka Namba Station.

Station layout
The station consists of two island platforms connected by an elevated station building.

Platforms

Adjacent stations

History
Ishikiri Station opened on April30, 1914. In 1941 it was transferred to the Kansai Kyūkō Railway, which became part of Kintetsu in 1944.

Passenger statistics
In fiscal 2018, the station was used by an average of 8,887 passengers daily.

Surrounding area
Ishikiri Shrine
Ishikiri Daibutsu
Ishikiri Memorial Park
Hotel Seiryu

See also
List of railway stations in Japan

References

External links

 Ishikiri Station 

Railway stations in Osaka Prefecture
Railway stations in Japan opened in 1914
Higashiōsaka